Suzanne Mary Moroney (born 8 May 1964), generally known as Sue Moroney, is a New Zealand politician. She is a member of the New Zealand Labour Party and was a Member of Parliament from 2005 general election until her retirement in 2017.

Early life
Sue Moroney was raised in the Waikato. Her parents farmed 66 acres of land to provide an income for their family of seven. She grew up in Walton and attended Walton Primary School and also spent time in Matamata.

Her family are keenly involved in horse racing. During her maiden speech Moroney quipped: "our family never had Michael Joseph Savage on our wall, but we did have a very tasteful mural of a horse race over our fireplace."

Moroney previously worked as a trainer of health and safety personnel, and held a number of positions in the union movement.

Politics
Moroney has been endorsed as a candidate by the Labour Party on a number of occasions. In the 2002 election she again contested  but chose not to stand for the list.

In the 2005 election Moroney again contested Piako and, while unsuccessful in the electorate, was ranked 42nd on the Party List and was elected to Parliament as a list MP.

In the 2008 general election she was the Labour candidate in the seat of Hamilton East and was returned to parliament due to her list placing of 22.

Member of Parliament

Sue Moroney was, with Shane Jones, one of two newly elected members of parliament to move and second the Address in Reply to the Governor General's speech from the throne at the opening of the 48th Parliament.

On 31 October 2007 Moroney was announced as the new Junior Government Whip, replacing Darren Hughes who became a Minister outside Cabinet.

Sue Moroney drafted a private members bill that entitled workers to their meal and rest breaks which, along with another private members bill in the name of Labour colleague Steve Chadwick, was the basis for the 'Breaks and Infant Feeding Act' which passed in August 2008.

The Labour Party entered Opposition after the 2008 General Election and Moroney became the Opposition Spokesperson for the portfolios of Women's Affairs and Early Childhood Education.

Moroney is a member of the Transport and Industrial Relations select committee.

Moroney had a private members bill in the ballot to extend Paid Parental Leave to six months from fourteen weeks. It was defeated after the 2015 election by a 60–60 vote with the National Party government and ACT voting against the bill. She also sponsored a petition signed by 15,808 others calling on the government to reinstate pay equity reviews for school support staff and social workers, and develop a plan to end the 12% gender pay gap in New Zealand.

Moroney presented the "Waikato Trains Now!" petition signed by 11,500 people to the House of Representatives on 1 April 2010, on behalf of the Campaign for Better Transport group. The petition called for a passenger rail service from Hamilton to Auckland.

In early 2011 Labour Leader Phil Goff announced a reshuffle of his caucus. Moroney was moved to a higher rank in the party caucus and gained the responsibility for Aged Care. Women's Affairs was passed on to first term MP Carol Beaumont.

Following the resignation from parliament of Darren Hughes, Moroney was further promoted to the front bench taking on the senior portfolio of Education and passed Aged Care onto Steve Chadwick.

Following the resignation of David Shearer in 2013 and the election of David Cunliffe as party leader, Moroney was elected as Chief Whip.

Only five months after its defeat, Moroney had another private members bill drawn from the ballot to extend Paid Parental Leave to six months from 18 weeks. The bill also allocates 'work contact hours' for parents wanting to keep in contact with their workplace during their leave, to no detriment to their parental leave entitlements.  the bill passed its first reading in Parliament on 16 September 2015 by 61 votes to 60, with support coming from New Zealand First, the Greens, the Maori Party and United Future. The bill is currently at committee stage.

In the November 2015 Labour Party caucus reshuffle, Moroney was promoted to the Labour Party shadow cabinet by leader Andrew Little. In her promotion, Moroney picked up the Transport portfolio and associate spokesperson on Industrial Relations and Safety.

On 30 April she announced she would not be standing in the 2017 election, saying, ""I made my decision after being notified last night that I had lost support from the party's ruling council for an electable position on the Labour Party list".

Personal life
Her family is prominent in racehorse owning and training. Her brother Paul Moroney who is a prominent horse trainer/owner was involved in the controversy surrounding Owen Glenn contributing to the New Zealand First party, by giving an affidavit supporting Mr Glenn's version of events.

Moroney is married with two sons.

References

External links

Profile on the Labour Party website

|-

1964 births
Living people
New Zealand Labour Party MPs
Women members of the New Zealand House of Representatives
New Zealand list MPs
Unsuccessful candidates in the 1996 New Zealand general election
Unsuccessful candidates in the 2002 New Zealand general election
Members of the New Zealand House of Representatives
21st-century New Zealand politicians
21st-century New Zealand women politicians